Raul Rebane (born 6 October 1953 in Pärnu) is an Estonian journalist and communication consultant.
Raul Rebane graduated from the University of Tartu in 1977 with a degree in journalism. 1977–1997 worked in ETV (Estonian Television) as a sports commentator, editor and program manager. Has worked 12 times in the Olympic Games as a commentator, team manager and member of the EBU's (European Broadcasting Union) Information Group.

Since 1999 has been working as a consultant, teacher and strategy adviser. From 2000 to 2012 he was discus thrower Gerd Kanter's team manager.

Raul Rebane is a candidate of master in chess.

Honours
 2008 Estonian Cultural Fund's physical culture and sports annual award
 2008 Order of the White Star, 4th class
 2010 European Athletics Innovation Awards top prize for his project entitled "The Social Role of an Athlete".
 Opinion leader of Estonia 2016

Publications

Books
 "Albertville and now Barcelona" (co-author), Vikertrükk 1992
 "From Helsinki to Helsinki" (co-author), Eesti Päevalehe Kirjastus 2005, 
 "Gerd Kanter. 15 steps to winning" (co-author with Gerd Kanter), 2009,

References

External links
 Janar Filippov. Mees, kes voolib Kanterit Eesti Ekspress, 7 September 2006
 Raul Rebane: Eesti spordis algab 2007. aastal taandareng Postimees, 8 December 2006
 Raul Rebane tahab püstitada "Saaremaa valsi" monumenti Postimees, 31 March 2007
 Urmo Soonvald. Raul Rebane: "Minu ülesanne on hoida Gerd eemal ahvatlustest." Õhtuleht, 29 September 2007
 Katrin Makko.  Raul Rebane elab uskudes ja lootes Virumaa Teataja, 24 July 2008
 Andres Keil. Raul Rebane (55) – Rebase uued märksõnad on ausus ja tahe EPL, 4 October 2008
 Raul Rebane: Urmas Ott õpetas, kuidas olla proff  ERR, 17 October 2008
 Raul Sulbi. Raul Rebane: Vene meedia töötab Putini doktriini alusel Postimees, 27 October 2008

1953 births
Living people
Estonian journalists
University of Tartu alumni
Recipients of the Order of the White Star, 4th Class